Xie Xuejin (21 May 1923 – 24 February 2017) was a Chinese geochemist who won the AAG Gold Medal in 2007. Xie was considered as the Father of Geochemical Mapping in China.

Biography
Xie was born 21 May 1923 in Beijing, with his ancestral home in Shanghai. He was the son of the geologist Xie Jiarong. From 1941 to 1945, Xie studied physics and chemistry at the College of Sciences of Zhejiang University. Xie also studied chemistry at Chongqing University.

After graduation, Xie mainly worked for the Institute of Geophysical and Geochemical Exploration of the Chinese Academy of Sciences (CAS). He was elected as an academician of CAS in 1980. Xie also taught as a professor at Changchun Geological College (later merged into Jilin University), Jilin Province, China.

Research activities
During the 1970s and 1980s, Xie proposed and led the National geochemical mapping project and the China-Regional Geochemistry-National Reconnaissance (RGNR) Project. He also technically sponsored these programs, and initially emphasized and demonstrated by mapping the gold mines in China's territory (see also Gold mining in China).

This RGNR project lasted for at least 24 years and scanned more than six million km2 of China's mainland surface. The useful information offered from this mega program also contributed to about 80% new mineral discoveries within recent two decades in China.

In the 1990s, Xie also contributed to the international standardization for methodology of world geochemical mapping.

Xie also further developed some new approaches of searching for buried giant ore deposits. Xie also proposed several deep-penetrating geochemical techniques and methods.

Academic assignments
Xie has served many academic positions including:
 Leader, the Geochemical Exploration Research Division of the Institute of Geophysical and Geochemical Exploration, CAS.
 Deputy director, the Institute of Geophysical and Geochemical Exploration, CAS.
 Honorary director, the Institute of Geophysical and Geochemical Exploration, CAS.
 Member of the executive committee of the IGCP Board, UNESCO.
 Associate editor and the member of the editorial board of the Journal of Geochemical Exploration
 Member of the editorial board of the Geochemistry: Exploration, Environment, Analysis
 Member of the central executive committee and the chairman of the Analytical Technology Committee of the Global Geochemical Mapping Working Group, IUGS.

Honors and awards
Xie received many honors and awards both from China and international organizations, especially the prestigious AAG Gold Medal from the Association of Applied Geochemists in June, 2007 at the 23rd International Geochemical Exploration Symposium banquet in Oviedo, Spain, for "his outstanding scientific achievements in exploration geochemistry".

Monograph

References

External links
 The Ho Leung Ho Lee Foundation: Biography of XIE Xuejin 
 Association of Applied Geochemists: Professor Xie Xuejing, the AAG Gold Medal awardee  (Including photos)
 News from China - International Seminar on Regional Exploration Geochemistry  
 AAG Gold Medal 2007  (Including photo)

1923 births
2017 deaths
Chemists from Beijing
Chinese geochemists
Educators from Beijing
Academic staff of Jilin University
Members of the Chinese Academy of Sciences
Zhejiang University alumni